Erlton/Stampede station (formerly named Erlton until 1995) is a CTrain light rail station in Manchester,  Calgary, Alberta. It is a stop on the South Line (Route 201). It is located on the exclusive LRT right of way, 1.7 km south of the City Hall interlocking, beside Macleod Trail at 25 Avenue SE. The station opened on May 25, 1981, as part of the original South line. The station consists of a center-loading platform with mezzanine access on the North end of the platform and grade-level access at the South end of the platform.

The station serves industrial areas of Manchester Industrial and is at the south entrance of Stampede Park, the site of the Calgary Stampede. It serves as an alternate access to the park and is often favored by riders wishing to avoid the crowds at Victoria Park/Stampede.

In 2005, the station registered an average of 1,700 boardings per weekday.

As part of Calgary Transit's plan to introduce four-car trains, Erlton/Stampede has had its platform extended to the south and can now handle four-car trains. Construction took place and the south grade-level access was temporarily closed from July 29 – December 7, 2011.

References

CTrain stations
Railway stations in Canada opened in 1981
1981 establishments in Alberta